Galeria Injecto is located in Ciudad Juárez, Chihuahua, México which is dedicated to, and houses parts of, the supersonic airliner, Concorde. Concorde was a joint venture between Great Britain's British Airways and France's Air France and was retired in 2003.

History

In 2004, many original components used for maintenance and operation of the Concorde were acquired through the Dovebid agency and transported by ABELS.

All components available in Galeria Injecto weigh more than 10 tonnes. They were all brought from Birmingham, England to Houston, Texas, by water. It took 30 days to move them all from one side of the world to the other. And finally, from Houston to El Paso, Texas, three trucks were used.

The museum is operated by students of Aeronautical Engineering from Universidad Autónoma de Ciudad Juárez.

Location

Galeria Injecto is located Ciudad Juárez, Chihuahua at 2093 De las Industrias Avenue and has a very easy access.

Objectives

By having this display at Ciudad Juarez, people will keep Concorde in their memories, not just as a simple aircraft, but as a very complex piece of engineering. People are also able to get information and find genuine components of this supersonic airplane.

It is also an entertaining place worth to visit by families and people interested in such a unique machine.

Exhibition

The exhibition houses more than 300 components  including a Rolls-Royce/Snecma Olympus 593 engine, a Snecma twin intake, control columns, seats and the left landing gear.

See also
List of aerospace museums

Web site 
 .

References

Aerospace museums in Mexico
Museums in Chihuahua (state)
Ciudad Juárez